Barbro Westerholm (16 June 1933 – 13 March 2023) was a Swedish politician of the Liberals. She was Member of Parliament (Riksdag) from 1988 to 1999 and again from 2006 to 2022.

From the mid-1960s Westerholm was an early pioneer in the field of pharmacovigilance, also working on the early stages of the WHO Drug Dictionary and the WHO Programme for International Drug Monitoring. In 1979 as general director of the Swedish National Board of Health and Welfare, she had homosexuality dropped from the list of mental health diseases.

Westerholm was a critic of ageism and advocates for the measurement and publicizing of data on the economic value of volunteer work, and in particular the contributions of older people.
In 2009 she was awarded the Nordic Public Health Prize for her work in fighting discrimination against the elderly. She was awarded the Illis quorum by the government of Sweden in 2003.

Westerholm died on 13 March 2023, at the age of 89.

References

External links

Barbro Westerholm at the Riksdag website

1933 births
2023 deaths
Women members of the Riksdag
Members of the Riksdag from the Liberals (Sweden)
Politicians from Stockholm
Recipients of the Illis quorum
20th-century Swedish women politicians
21st-century Swedish women politicians